Daniele Paparusso (born 26 March 1993) is an Italian football player. He plays for Fidelis Andria.

Club career
He made his Serie B debut for Ternana on 2 December 2013 in a game against Bari.

On 29 August 2019, he joined Serie C club Casertana.

On 18 September 2020, he returned to Fidelis Andria.

References

External links
 

1993 births
People from Andria
Footballers from Apulia
Living people
Italian footballers
A.C.N. Siena 1904 players
U.S. Poggibonsi players
Ternana Calcio players
U.S. Città di Pontedera players
F.C. Grosseto S.S.D. players
A.C. Tuttocuoio 1957 San Miniato players
U.S. Vibonese Calcio players
S.S. Racing Club Roma players
S.S. Racing Club Fondi players
A.S. Pro Piacenza 1919 players
S.S. Fidelis Andria 1928 players
Casertana F.C. players
Serie B players
Serie C players
Serie D players
Association football defenders
Sportspeople from the Province of Barletta-Andria-Trani